The list of rivers in Mississippi includes any rivers that flow through part of the  State of Mississippi. The major rivers in Mississippi are the Mississippi River, Pearl River, Pascagoula River and the Tombigbee River, along with their main tributaries: the Tallahatchie River, Yazoo River, Big Black River, Leaf River, and the Chickasawhay River. However, other tributaries vary in size, with some also draining rather sizable areas of Mississippi (Also see list below: Alphabetically).

The various rivers, with their tributaries, can be organized by drainage basin, as shown in the related maps below.

By drainage basin
This list is arranged by drainage basin, with respective tributaries indented under each larger stream's name.  All rivers in Mississippi eventually flow into the Gulf of Mexico.

Mobile River (AL)
Tombigbee River
Sucarnoochee River
Noxubee River
Bogue Chitto
Luxapallila Creek
Oak Slush Creek
Tibbee Creek
Buttahatchee River
Twenty Mile Creek
Town Creek
East Fork Tombigbee River
Tennessee River
Osborne Creek
Wolf Creek
Pascagoula River
Escatawpa River
Black Creek
Red Creek
Chickasawhay River
Buckatunna Creek
Chunky River
Chunky Creek
Okahatta Creek
Okatibbee Creek
Leaf River
Bogue Homo
Tallahala Creek
Tallahoma Creek
Bouie River
Bowie Creek
Okatoma Creek
Oakohay Creek
West Tallahala Creek
Tchoutacabouffa River
Biloxi River
Little Biloxi River
Wolf River
Jourdan River
Catahoula Creek

Pearl River
Hobolochitto Creek
Bogue Chitto
Strong River
Yockanookany River
Tuscolameta Creek
Lobutcha Creek
Nanih Waiya Creek
Bogue Chitto
Tallahaga Creek
Tangipahoa River
Tickfaw River
Amite River

Mississippi River
Buffalo River
Little Buffalo River
Homochitto River
Coles Creek
Bayou Pierre
Little Bayou Pierre
Tallahalla Creek
Big Black River
Yazoo River
Deer Creek
Little Sunflower River
Sunflower River (or Big Sunflower River)
Bogue Phalia
Quiver River
Hushpuckena River
Tallahatchie River
Cassidy Bayou
Tillatoba Creek
Panola Quitman Floodway
Yocona River
Little Tallahatchie River
Tippah River
Coldwater River
Old Little Tallahatchie River
Old Yocona River
Yalobusha River
Skuna River
Wolf River
Hatchie River
Tuscumbia River
Ohio River (KY)
.... River

Alphabetically
Bayou Pierre
Big Black River
Biloxi River
Black Creek
Bogue Chitto (Nanih Waiya Creek)
Bogue Chitto (Tombigbee River)
Bogue Chitto (West Pearl River)
Bogue Homo
Bogue Phalia
Bouie River
Bowie Creek
Buckatunna Creek
Buffalo River
Buttahatchee River
Cassidy Bayou
Catahoula Creek
Chickasawhay River
Chunky River
Coldwater River
Coles Creek
Deer Creek
East Fork Tombigbee River
Escatawpa River
Fair River
Hatchie River
Hobolochitto Creek
Homochitto River
Hushpuckena River
Jourdan River
Leaf River
Little Bayou Pierre
Little Biloxi River
Little Buffalo River
Little Sunflower River
Little Tallahatchie River
Lobutcha Creek
Luxapallila Creek
Mississippi River
Nanih Waiya Creek
Noxubee River
Oak Slush Creek
Oakohay Creek
Old Little Tallahatchie River
Old Yocona River
Okatibbee Creek
Okatoma Creek
Panola Quitman Floodway
Pascagoula River
Pearl River
Quiver River
Red Creek
Skuna River
Strong River
Sucarnoochee River
Sunflower River
Tallahaga Creek
Tallahala Creek
Tallahalla Creek
Tallahatchie River
Tallahoma Creek
Tangipahoa River
Tchoutacabouffa River
Tennessee River
Tibbee Creek
Tillatoba Creek
Tippah River
Town Creek
Tuscolameta Creek
Tuscumbia River
Twenty Mile Creek
West Tallahala Creek
Wolf River (Mississippi)
Wolf River (Tennessee)
Yalobusha River
Yazoo River
Yockanookany River
Yocona River

See also

List of rivers in the United States

References 
USGS Geographic Names Information System
USGS Hydrologic Unit Map - State of Mississippi (1974)

External links
Mississippi Streamflow Data from the USGS

Mississippi
 
Rivers